André Jousseaume (27 July 1894 in Yvré-l'Évêque - 26 May 1960 in Chantilly) was a French equestrian and Olympic champion. He won a gold medal in team dressage at the 1932 Summer Olympics in Los Angeles, and another gold medal at the 1948 Summer Olympics in London.

References

External links

1894 births
1960 deaths
French dressage riders
Olympic equestrians of France
French male equestrians
Olympic gold medalists for France
Olympic silver medalists for France
Olympic bronze medalists for France
Equestrians at the 1932 Summer Olympics
Equestrians at the 1936 Summer Olympics
Equestrians at the 1948 Summer Olympics
Equestrians at the 1952 Summer Olympics
Equestrians at the 1956 Summer Olympics
Olympic medalists in equestrian
Medalists at the 1952 Summer Olympics
Medalists at the 1948 Summer Olympics
Medalists at the 1936 Summer Olympics
Sportspeople from Sarthe